San Miguel de Escalada is a monastery in the province of León, Spain, located 10 km from the Way of St. James pilgrimage route to Santiago de Compostela. The building is an example of Mozarabic art and architecture or Repoblación art and architecture.

History
This inscription that has disappeared but was published by Father Risco in 1786 gave information about the church's consecration in 951 by Bishop Genadio of Astorga, around the time of the founding of the Kingdom of León. It was constructed on a site dedicated to Saint Michael, probably a Visigothic church:

In 1050, due to an increase in the number of monks, the foundation was renewed by the Abbot Sabarico. In 1155 King Alfonso VII of León gave the monastery to the congregation of St Rufo of Avignon.

After the disentailment of ecclesiastical properties and lands in 1836 (Desamortización de Mendizábal), the monastery was abandoned and the monastic offices disappeared. The only buildings extant are the church, the tower, and the San Fructuoso chapel. The tower and the chapel are of Romanesque style.  Later in the nineteenth century the buildings were declared a national monument.

Architecture
The monastery church's nave has three aisles separated by columns and large horseshoe arches, with their apses and a crossing, which is not covered by a cimborio or central tower. The choir is separated from the principal nave by three horseshoe arches sometimes called an iconostasis).

Despite the floor plan, the building appears from the exterior as a rectangular block. All arches take down in marble shafts and Corinthian steeples proceeding from other Visigothic or Roman constructions (as it may be appreciated in a cyma carved as from a gravestone, perhaps from the nearby Roman city of Lancia).

The building has wood panels, which are decorated with paintings from the 15th century.

Architectural highlights include a meridional porch fixed by twelve horseshoe arche), which were built in two different phases: the seven occidental arches, with columns and steeples are in the moorish style, while the Mozarabic work from the 10th century is preserved in the alfiz decorations around the arches

Gallery

See also
 History of medieval Arabic and Western European domes

References

External links

Bien de Interés Cultural landmarks in the Province of León
Mozarabic architecture
Roman Catholic churches in Spain
Monasteries in Castile and León
Christian monasteries established in the 10th century